Vadim Nikolayevich Sobko (May 18 (O.S. May 5), 1912 in Moscow – September 12, 1981) was a Soviet/Ukrainian writer. His novel, Guarantee of Peace was an early example of Cold War-era anti-American propaganda and was awarded the Stalin Prize (1951). He also was the winner of seven orders, and several medals.

He wrote the screenplay of the 1962 drama film Flower on the Stone.

References 

1912 births
1981 deaths
Soviet writers
Ukrainian writers
Ukrainian science fiction writers
Stalin Prize winners